The Ministry of Education (MINeDUC) of Rwanda, previously the Ministère de l'Éducation, de la Science, de la Technologie et de la Recherche scientifique, is headquartered in Kigali. As of December 2017, the minister is Dr. Eugène Mutimura. He was preceded by Dr. Papias Malimba Musafiri, who served in that position since June 2015 - December 2017.

Number of schools, students, and staff 
In 2017, the estimated population of Rwanda was 11.8 million people. MINeDUC oversees over 13,000 education centers, 93,000 staff, and over 3.6 million students. The primary and secondary schools are organized into 30 administrative districts.

References

External links
 Ministry of Education

Rwanda
Education